Uncial 0280 (in the Gregory-Aland numbering), is a Greek uncial manuscript of the New Testament. Paleographically it has been assigned to the 8th century.

Description 
The codex contains a small part of the Epistle to the Hebrews 9:14-18, on one parchment leaf (31 cm by 23 cm). The text is written in two columns per page, 24 lines per page, in uncial letters. It is a palimpsest.

Currently it is dated by the INTF to the 8th century.

Location 
It is one of the manuscripts discovered in Saint Catherine's Monastery, Sinai in May 1975, during restoration work. Currently the codex is housed at the monastery (N.E. ΜΓ 15a).

See also 

 List of New Testament uncials
 Biblical manuscript
 Textual criticism

References

Further reading 

 

Greek New Testament uncials
Palimpsests
8th-century biblical manuscripts